Yoannis Montesino (born 26 June 1971) is a Cuban former professional tennis player.

Montesino appeared in 38 Federation Cup ties for Cuba, from 1992 to 2000, winning 21 singles and 22 doubles rubbers. Her professional career was limited to satellite tournaments across Latin America, where she won four ITF doubles titles.

ITF finals

Doubles: 8 (4–4)

References

External links
 
 
 

1971 births
Living people
Cuban female tennis players
Central American and Caribbean Games medalists in tennis
Central American and Caribbean Games bronze medalists for Cuba